Günter Keute (born 21 December 1955) is a retired German footballer. He spent three seasons with Eintracht Braunschweig in the Bundesliga, as well as one season in the 2. Bundesliga.

References

External links

1955 births
Living people
People from Arnsberg
Sportspeople from Arnsberg (region)
Footballers from North Rhine-Westphalia
German footballers
Eintracht Braunschweig players
Association football forwards
Bundesliga players
2. Bundesliga players